Peter Duffell (10 July 1922 − 12 December 2017) was a British film and television director and screenwriter, born in Canterbury, England.

The British actor Christopher Lee called Duffell Britain's "most under-rated director."

Biography
Duffell was born in Canterbury, Kent in 1922. He was the only son of a broken marriage, which resulted in his attending a variety of schools in Kent and London, as his mother moved away to work and he was raised by his grandmother. With a strong academic bent and great enthusiasm for the arts, he studied at London University and then at Keble College, Oxford, where he took an honours degree in English language and literature.

Duffell began his career as a director with installments of the film series  Scotland Yard and the Edgar Wallace Mysteries second features for Anglo-Amalgamated, both originally made for cinema release in the UK, as well as making documentaries and television commercials.

Based on his television work, Milton Subotsky of Amicus Productions selected Duffell to direct The House That Dripped Blood (1970), though he turned down other Amicus films because he did not want to be typecast as a horror director.

He moved on to write and direct the film script of a book by one of his greatest heroes Graham Greene, who, although notoriously dismissive of most film adaptations of his work, rated Duffell’s England Made Me (1973) "excellent". He was commissioned by Warner Brothers to direct Inside Out (1975), a caper movie filmed in Berlin.

Duffell was also Greene's choice to write and direct The Honorary Consul. Together they collaborated on the script, but in the event other interests intervened and to the great dismay of both Duffell and Greene the film was made to another script by another director. However, the two men remained life-long friends and Greene continued to hope that they would again work together. Duffell won the BAFTA award for Best Director for Caught on A Train (1980) written by Stephen Poliakoff and featuring Peggy Ashcroft and Michael Kitchen. He also scripted and directed films based on the work of writers such as Margaret Drabble and Francis King, and wrote many other screenplays for cinema and television. Experience Preferred but Not Essential (1982), which he directed for David Puttnam, was shown at the London Film Festival and at festivals in Italy and Canada. It enjoyed box-office success in American where – after a rave interview by Vincent Canby in The New York Times – it ran for six months in one New York cinema alone.

Duffell's six-hour television epic The Far Pavilions (1984) for HBO and Goldcrest (shown by Channel 4 in the UK) from the best-selling novel by M. M. Kaye, was filmed in India. Duffell's direction of the vast, colourful crowd scenes was a triumph and, as Omar Sharif said, on a par with David Lean's crowd scenes.

Letters from An Unknown Lover (Les Louves, 1986), is a bi-lingual French television film, also in English. King of The Wind (1990), is a children's adventure film shot in Turkey and the UK.

Duffell's many TV credits as director and writer include The Avengers (1967), Man in a Suitcase (1967–68), Journey to the Unknown (1969), Strange Report (1969), The Adventures of Black Beauty (1972), The Racing Game (1979–80), Inspector Morse (1988), and Space Precinct (1995).

One of Duffell's great passions was music, above all Mozart, jazz – in his youth he led The Rhythm Club of High Wycombe - and flamenco, playing semi-pro flamenco guitar, sometimes at Ronnie Scott's, and producing a flamenco LP by leading Spanish musicians. He loved cricket and was a member of the MCC for many years.

His autobiography Playing Piano in A Brothel, the title derived from an old film industry joke, was published in the USA by Bear Manor Media. (When asked what he did for a living the man replied "I'm a film director, but please don't tell my mother, she thinks I play piano in a brothel".) He lived with his wife of 30 years, the publicist Rosslyn Cliffe Duffell, between homes in South West of France and the South West of England, where he died after a stroke on 12 December 2017. He also leaves behind Son Christopher and three grandsons, twins William, a successful photographer, Edwin Spooner and James.

Filmography

 The Never Never Murder (1961) (short film)
 The Silent Weapon (1961) (short film)
 The Grand Junction Case (1961) (short film)
 Partners in Crime (1961)
 The House That Dripped Blood (1971)
 England Made Me (1973) + screenplay
 Inside Out (1975)
 Caught on a Train (TV film, 1980)
 Daisy (TV film, 1980)
 The Waterfall (TV film, 1980) + screenplay
 Experience Preferred... But Not Essential (1982)
 The Far Pavilions (TV Mini-series, 1984)
 Letters to an Unknown Lover (TV film, 1986)
 Hand in Glove (TV film, 1987)
 King of the Wind (1990)
 Some Other Spring (TV film, 1991) + screenplay
 Genghis Khan (1992)

Memoirs
 Playing Piano in a Brothel: Memoirs of a Film Director (2010), with a foreword by Christopher Lee

References

External links

1922 births
2017 deaths
Alumni of Keble College, Oxford
British film directors
People from Canterbury